Montia fontana, commonly known as blinks or water blinks, water chickweed or annual water miner's lettuce, is a herbaceous annual plant of the genus Montia. It is a common plant that can be found in wet environments around the globe, from the tropics to the Arctic. It is quite variable in morphology, taking a variety of forms. It is sometimes aquatic.

Montia fontana is divided into four subspecies, subsp. fontana, subsp. amporitana, subsp. chondrosperma and subsp. variabilis

In some countries like Spain it is consumed as salad and it is highly demanded in markets and restaurants specialized in foraged foods like wild mushrooms.

References

External links 

Jepson Manual Treatment
Photo gallery

fontana
Cosmopolitan species
Edible plants
Plants described in 1753
Taxa named by Carl Linnaeus